Minoahchak 74C is an Indian reserve of the Zagime Anishinabek in Saskatchewan.

References

Indian reserves in Saskatchewan
Zagime Anishinabek